Alan Kardec de Souza Pereira Júnior (born January 12, 1989), known as Alan Kardec, is a Brazilian professional football player who plays for Atlético Mineiro as a striker.

He is named after the systematizer of Spiritism, Allan Kardec.

Club career

Vasco da Gama
Alan Kardec debuted for CR Vasco da Gama on 14 February 2007 in Manaus, in a 2–1 victory over Fast Clube in the Copa do Brasil. On 11 April 11, he scored his first goal for Vasco when his club and Botafogo drew 4–4 in a Campeonato Carioca match. On 21 July 2007, he scored his first Série A goal when Vasco beat Atlético Mineiro 4–0. He played 26 Série A matches and scored eight goals in 2007, while in 2008, he played 19 matches and scored two goals in that competition.

Internacional
On 1 September 2009, Alan Kardec was loaned to Internacional. He played his first game as an Internacional player on 28 October, a Série A game against São Paulo at Estádio do Morumbi, in which he came as a substitute for Fabiano Eller.

Benfica
Alan Kardec announced on 13 December 2009 that he will play for Benfica in the 2010 season after Vasco had accepted a €2.5 million bid from the Portuguese club. The following week, he signed a personal contract with Benfica. On 18 March 2010, he scored the winning goal in Benfica's UEFA Europa League match against Marseille with a ferocious strike from a hard angle.

Santos
In July 2011, was confirmed that Alan Kardec would be loaned for one season to Santos. Santos attempt to renew the loan in July 2012, but Benfica denied, only allowing the player to leave on a permanent deal. Alan Kardec played occasionally for Benfica's B-team, as he was effectively blocked in the first team by strikers Óscar Cardozo, Lima and Rodrigo.

Palmeiras
In June 2013, Brazilian side Palmeiras confirmed the loan deal of Alan Kardec for one-and-half-years from Benfica, with an option to make the move permanent. Kardec comes back to Brazil as a substitute for Kléber, that had a bad passage for the São Paulo city based club.

In 2014, Alan Kardec had a great start to the year, scoring against São Paulo and Corinthians, two of Palmeiras' biggest rivals.

São Paulo
Alan Kardec signed a five-year deal with São Paulo on 12 May 2014, with the club paying €4.5 million to Benfica.

Chongqing Lifan
On 15 July 2016, São Paulo announced that they had reached an agreement with Chinese club Chongqing Lifan for the transfer of Alan Kardec, for a fee of €5 million. On 1 November 2020, after scoring in a 2–0 win over Shandong Luneng, Alan Kardec became the top scorer in the history of Chongqing Lifan, with 56 goals.

Shenzhen
Alan Kardec spent the 2021 season with Shenzhen, scoring 12 goals in 19 appearances.

Atlético Mineiro
On 24 June 2022, Alan Kardec joined Atlético Mineiro on a free transfer.

International career
Alan Kardec played eight South American Youth Championship matches for the Brazilian under-20 team between January 20, 2009, and February 8, scoring two goals against Uruguay and Argentina respectively. He scored two goals in Brazil's first 2009 FIFA U-20 World Cup game, played on September 27, 2009, against Costa Rica. He also scored a goal in the round of 16, against Uruguay, played on 7 October 2009, and the only goal of the semi-final, against Costa Rica, played on 13 October 2009.

He was one of seven players put on standby for Brazil's 2014 FIFA World Cup team.

In July 2021, it was revealed that the China national football team were attempting to naturalize him. He would be eligible to represent China PR from January 2022.

Career statistics

Honors

Club
Vasco da Gama
Campeonato Brasileiro Série B: 2009

Benfica
Primeira Liga: 2009–10
Taça da Liga: 2009–10, 2010–11

Santos
Campeonato Paulista: 2012

Palmeiras
Campeonato Brasileiro Série B: 2013

International
Brazil
South American Youth Football Championship: 2009

References

External links
 Globoesporte 
 Alan Kardec at playmakerstats.com (English version of ogol.com.br)
 
 

1989 births
Living people
Brazilian footballers
Brazil under-20 international footballers
Brazil youth international footballers
Brazilian expatriate footballers
CR Vasco da Gama players
Sport Club Internacional players
S.L. Benfica footballers
Santos FC players
S.L. Benfica B players
Sociedade Esportiva Palmeiras players
São Paulo FC players
Chongqing Liangjiang Athletic F.C. players
Shenzhen F.C. players
Clube Atlético Mineiro players
Campeonato Brasileiro Série A players
Campeonato Brasileiro Série B players
Primeira Liga players
Liga Portugal 2 players
Chinese Super League players
Expatriate footballers in Portugal
Expatriate footballers in China
Brazilian expatriate sportspeople in China
Association football forwards
Sportspeople from Rio de Janeiro (state)
People from Barra Mansa